The 2020 Georgia State Panthers baseball team represented Georgia State University in the 2020 NCAA Division I baseball season. The Panthers played their home games at Georgia State Baseball Complex and were led by first year head coach Brad Stromdahl.

On March 12, the Sun Belt Conference announced the indefinite suspension of all spring athletics, including baseball, due to the increasing risk of the COVID-19 pandemic.

Preseason

Signing Day Recruits

Sun Belt Conference Coaches Poll
The Sun Belt Conference Coaches Poll was released sometime on January 30, 2020 and the Panthers were picked to finish sixth in the East Division.

Preseason All-Sun Belt Team & Honors
No players were chosen to the Preseason team

Personnel

Roster

Coaching staff

Schedule and results

Schedule Source:
*Rankings are based on the team's current ranking in the D1Baseball poll.

References

Georgia State
 Georgia State Panthers baseball seasons
Georgia State Panthers baseball